FTR may refer to:
 Financial transmission right in an electricity market
 FTR (professional wrestling), a professional wrestling team of Dax Harwood and Cash Wheeler
 FTR (bus), a British rapid-transit bus system
 Family Tracing and Reunification
 Finist'air, a French airline
DRDO Floating Test Range, an Indian military ship
 Forget The Rules, an Australian television show
 Formylmethanofuran—tetrahydromethanopterin N-formyltransferase
 Frontier Communications, an American telecommunications company
 FTR Moto, a British motorcycle parts manufacturer